"Thinking About You" is a song by Swedish dance music duo Axwell & Ingrosso. The song was released in Sweden on 27 May 2016 as the seventh single from their debut studio album More Than You Know. The song was written by Richard Archer, Sebastian Ingrosso, Axel Hedfors, Sebastian Furrer and Jacob Tillberg. The song peaked at number 64 on the Swedish Singles Chart.

Track listing

Charts

Weekly charts

Year-end charts

Release history

References

2015 songs
2015 singles
Songs written by Axwell
Songs written by Sebastian Ingrosso
Axwell & Ingrosso songs